Dzietrzychowice  is a village in the administrative district of Gmina Żagań, within Żagań County, Lubusz Voivodeship, in western Poland.

The village has a population of 800.

References

Dzietrzychowice